Ace of Coins is a card used in Latin suited playing cards which include tarot decks. It is part of what tarot card readers call the "Minor Arcana" The coins suit is often called "Pentacles" by tarot readers. Tarot cards are used throughout much of Europe to play Tarot card games. In English-speaking countries, where the games are largely unknown, Tarot cards came to be utilized primarily for divinatory purposes

References

Suit of Coins